Holyrood is a town on the Avalon Peninsula in Newfoundland and Labrador, Canada. It is in Division 1, on Conception Bay. It is approximately a 30-minute drive from the capital city of St. John's. During King William's War, the village was destroyed in the Avalon Peninsula Campaign.

The town is famous for being at the bottom of the bay and having a large cross on the top of the predominant mountain "George Cove". Holyrood is also renowned for its squid fishery and caplin "rolling" which happens in late spring, early summer. "Rolling" refers to the mating of the caplin when they beach themselves and can be picked up by hand. It also hosts the popular "Squid Fest," several days of squid-themed activities culminating in an outdoor festival of drinking and traditional music. The festival attracts thousands of locals and tourists each year.

The town has a population of 2,471 (as of 2021). Since 2021, Holyrood has been considered part of the St. John's metropolitan area.

Demographics 

Services
Holyrood contains an elementary school, Holy Cross Elementary (kindergarten and grades 1 to 6). After completing grade 6, students attend Roncalli Central High in Avondale.

Notable people
 Kate Corbett, actress
 Philip J. Lewis (1900–1985), was a lawyer and politician in Newfoundland

See also
 List of cities and towns in Newfoundland and Labrador
 Holyrood weather radar
 Monarchy in Newfoundland and Labrador

References

Populated coastal places in Canada
Towns in Newfoundland and Labrador